BOC Group may refer to:

 Bank of China Group (BOCG), 
 Boc group, a protecting group used in organic chemistry
 BOC (company), a British-based chemical company